This list of General Presidencies of the Relief Society includes the General President and the counselors of the Relief Society General Presidency of the Church of Jesus Christ of Latter-day Saints.

References

Main
Latter Day Saint movement lists
Relief Society
Relief Society general presidencies